The governor of Quirino is the local chief executive and head of the Provincial Government of Quirino in the Philippines. Along with the governors of Batanes, Cagayan, Isabela, Nueva Vizcaya, the province's chief executive is a member of the Regional Development Council of the Cagayan Valley Region.

History
On June 18, 1966, through Republic Act No. 4734, the subprovince of Quirino was created from Nueva Vizcaya. Subsequently, On November 14, 1967, Jose B. Aquino was elected first Lieutenant governor of subprovince reporting under the civil governor of Nueva Vizcaya. He officially started his office on January 1, 1968. 

On September 17, 1971, Quirino became an independent province through Republic Act No. 6394. Subsequently, the first provincial election was held on November 8, 1971.

List of governors of Quirino

References

Governors of provinces of the Philippines